GW 190412 was a gravitational wave (GW) signal observed by the LIGO and Virgo detectors on 12 April 2019. In April 2020, it was announced as the first time a collision of a pair of very differently sized black holes has been detected. As a result of this asymmetry, the signal included two measurable harmonics with frequencies approximately a factor 1.5 (a perfect fifth) apart.

The collision took place 2.4 billion light-years away. The heavier of the black holes had a mass of 29.7 solar masses, and the lighter one around 8.4 solar masses. The difference in mass meant that the secondary harmonic in the signal was strong enough to be detected, allowing researchers to perform a test of general relativity and determine that the larger black hole was spinning.

See also
 Gravitational-wave astronomy
 List of gravitational wave observations

References

External links
 

Black holes
Gravitational waves
April 2019 events
2019 in science
2019 in space